Barkhad Ali Salah was a veteran Somali politician and historian. He served as the first mayor of Bosaso.

Background
Salah was born in 1938 in Bosaso, located in the northeastern Bari region. He hailed from the Dishiishe, a sub-clan of the Darod. Salah had 13 children. His firstborn was a daughter, Baxsan Barkhad, and his lastborn was a son, Osman Barkhad.

References

Ethnic Somali people
Somali National University alumni
Puntland politicians
Somalian Muslims
1932 births
2016 deaths
Mayors of places in Somalia